Gerry Bostock (15 July 1942 – 16 May 2014) was a Bundjalung activist, playwright, poet and filmmaker.

Early life
Bostock was born on 15 July 1942 in Grafton, New South Wales, of the Bundjalung people.

After spending nine years in the Australian Army, Bostock moved to Redfern, a suburb of Sydney, where he became involved in political activism.

Activism and career
Bostock was involved in the struggles of Indigenous Australian people and took part in setting up the National Black Theatre in Sydney. He was also known as a healer.

He made a substantial contribution to Australian literature as a playwright, poet and writer.

His 1976 play Here Comes the Nigger was performed at the Black Theatre Arts and Culture Centre in Redfern, starring Athol Compton and Julie McGregor, with Marcia Langton in a supporting role. Many of the cast were involved in the Black Women's Action group and its monthly publication Koori Bina.

With Alec Morgan, he produced the 1983 documentary, Lousy Little Sixpence, which covers the treatment of Aboriginal Australians from 1900 to 1946.

References

1942 births
2014 deaths
Bundjalung people
Indigenous Australian writers
Australian documentary filmmakers